Athmallik (Sl. No.: 63) is a Vidhan Sabha constituency of Angul district, Odisha.

This constituency includes Athmallik, Athmallik block, Kishorenagar block and 9 GPs (Antulia, Saradhapur, Matiasahi, Manikajodi, Jagannathpur, Tainsi, Kothabhuin, Tikarpada and Purunakote) of Angul block.

In 2019 election, Biju Janata Dal candidate Ramesh Chandra Sai defeated Bharatiya Janata Party candidate Bhagirathi Pradhan by a margin of 47,184 votes.

Elected Members

Seventeen elections were held between 1951 and 2019 including one By-Election in 1955.
Elected members from the Athmallik constituency are:

2019: (63): Ramesh Chandra Sai (BJD)
2014: (63): Sanjeeb Kumar Sahoo (BJD)
2009: (63): Sanjeeb Kumar Sahoo (BJD)
2004: (115):Nagendra Kumar Pradhan (BJD)
2000: (115):Nagendra Kumar Pradhan (BJD)
1995: (115): Amarnath Pradhan (Congress) 
1990: (115): Nagendra Kumar Pradhan (CPI-M) 
1985: (115): Amarnath Pradhan (Congress)
1980: (115): Santosh Kumar Pradhan (Congress-I)
1977: (115): Balakrushna Pattanayak (Janata Party)
1974: (115): Bhajaman Behera (Utkal Congress)
1971: (140): Raja Kishore Pradhan (Praja Socialist Party)
1967: (140): Surendra Pradhan (CPI-M)
1961: (80): Khetramohan Panigrahhi (Ganatantra Parishad)
1957: (54): Khetramohan Panigrahhi (Ganatantra Parishad)
1951: (13, By-Election): K. C. Deo (Congress)
1951: (13): Dwitiya Raul (Congress)

2019 Election Result
In 2019 election, Biju Janata Dal candidate Ramesh Chandra Sai defeated Bharatiya Janata Party candidate Bhagirathi Pradhan by a margin of 47,184 votes.

2014 Election Result
In 2014 election, Biju Janata Dal candidate Sanjeeb Kumar Sahoo defeated Indian National Congress candidate Surendra Kumar Pradhan by a margin of 19,533 votes.

2009 Election Result

Notes

References

Assembly constituencies of Odisha
Politics of Angul district